Lara Sousa also Lara de Sousa is a Mozambican filmmaker. She worked as a programmer of the DOCKANEMA Documentary Festival of Mozambique for a number of years and had been engaged in social and development projects, focusing her research on gender issues, human rights and others.

Education
Sousa has a specialization degree in Documentary Direction, obtained from the International School of Cinema and Television (EICTV) of San Antonio de los Baños, Cuba. She also studied Anthropology at ISCTE, Portugal and UCM, Spain, specializing in Visual Anthropology.

Career
In 2017, she wrote, directed and produced the Spanish documentary, La Finca del Miedo (The Farm of Fear), produced by IECTV, Cuba.

In 2018, she directed a documentary film, Fin (End), also released in Cuba.

The documentary, The Ship and the Sea (Portuguese: O Navio e o Mar), which she co-produced with Matheus Mello, and co-directed  with Everlane Moraes, was selected alongside about 30 other films as a Finance Forum Projects at the 11th Durban International Film Festival (DIFF 2020) held between September 10 to 20, online. The film also won at the 2020 Durban FilmMart, the International Documentary Film Festival Amsterdam (IDFA) Award of The Netherlands.

She participated at the 2020 Indaba initiative selection, under the first category, "The 2020 participants with projects are producers", with the feature film project by Inadelso Costa titled, "Karigana".

She participated in the Colab NowNow exhibition organized by the British Council, partnering with Maputo Fast Forward festival of Mozambique and Fak’ugesi African Digital Innovation Festival of South Africa.

Filmography

References

External links
 Lara Sousa on IMDb
 Lara Sousa on Berlinale
 Meet the Creator: Lara Sousa on Tshimologong
 Mozambique, Lara Sousa on CINAFRIC

Living people
Mozambican film directors
Year of birth missing (living people)
Mozambican women film directors